Visit Me is the third and most recent studio album by American R&B duo Changing Faces. It was released by Atlantic Records on October 10, 2000 in the United States. Members Cassandra Lucas and Charisse Rose worked with a variety of producers on the album, including R. Kelly, Bryan-Michael Cox, Jazze Pha, Bryce Wilson, and singer Joe. Guest vocalists include rappers Queen Pen and B.R.E.T.T., singer-producer Malik Pendleton, and singer Lil Mo.

Upon release, Visit Me earned generally positive reviews from music critics. It peaked at number 9 on the US Billboard Top R&B/Hip-Hop Albums and number 46 on the US Billboard Hot 100, their lowest entries on both charts up to then. The album spawned the singles "That Other Woman" and "Ladies' Man"; the former reached the top five of the US Dance Club Songs. A demo version of "Come Over," sung by Aaliyah, appeared on the singer's posthumous compilation album I Care 4 U (2002) and was released as the album's fourth and final single in May 2003.

Critical reception

MacKenzie Wilson from Allmusic found that the album "brings about more of a mature attitude and a sheer presentation of urban beats and classic R&B grooves. On Visit Me, Cassandra Lucas and Charisse Rose deliver another dose of sassy wit and hellcat rhythms. The 15-song set list featured on Visit Me is slightly vibrant [...] They do not hide anything, and that serves for a brash delivery alongside fellow female artists such as Toni Braxton, Whitney Houston, and Lil' Kim."

Track listing

Charts

Release history

References 

2000 albums
Atlantic Records albums
Changing Faces (group) albums